The Mitchell E. Daniels, Jr. School of Business (formerly known as Krannert School of Management) is the school of business at Purdue University, a public research university in West Lafayette, Indiana. It offers instruction at the undergraduate, master's, and doctoral levels.

History
The School of Industrial Management at Purdue University was created in 1958 from the merger of the Department of Economics (established in the School of Science, Education, and Humanities in 1953) and the Department of Industrial Management and Transportation (part of the Schools of Engineering since 1956). The Krannert Graduate School of Industrial Administration was founded in 1962 with a $2.7 million endowment from Herman Krannert and Ellnora Krannert. The AACSB accredited the new school in 1967. In the early years, students were required to pursue a second major, in a technical subject, in addition to their coursework in business and management. The curriculum expanded over the following decade and the word "Industrial" was dropped from the schools' names in the mid 1970s.

On February 3, 2023, Purdue’s business school was formally renamed the Mitchell E. Daniels, Jr. School of Business, in honor of Mitch Daniels, the 12th president of Purdue University. Purdue's business school is accredited by the AACSB.

Academics

The school currently has 20+ clubs and organizations open to undergraduates, including the School of Management Council (SMC). There are ~25 professional, cultural and special interest clubs at the graduate level.

Undergraduate
On February 13, 2023, the Dean and Barbara White Family Foundation committed $50 million to Purdue University to name the undergraduate institute in the Mitchell E. Daniels, Jr. School of Business. The School of Business offers eight undergraduate degree programs. In keeping with the global scope of the modern manager, all programs include instruction in the international aspects of business and economics.  The "3+2" program is available to outstanding undergraduates in the School of Business. The program allows students to complete their B.S. and Master of Business Administration (MBA) degrees in just five years.

Master's & Executive
The Krannert Graduate Institute at the Daniels School of Business awards several master's degrees: MBA, EMBA, International Masters in Management, Master of Science in Human Resource Management, Master of Science in Industrial Administration, Master of Science in Finance, Master of Science in Global Entrepreneurship, Master of Science in Global Supply Chain Management and a Weekend MBA. These programs are housed in Rawls Hall. The school also offers a variety of joint programs with other colleges on campus including the combined Doctor of Pharmacy (PharmD) and Master of Science in Industrial Administration (MSIA), the combined Bachelor of Science in Industrial Engineering (BSIE) and Master of Business Administration (MBA), and the combined Bachelor of Science in Mechanical Engineering (BSME) and Master of Business Administration (MBA)

In 2020, despite tight alumni classes and a well respected curriculum the School of Business was forced to pause its full time residential MBA program.

Doctoral
The School of Business's Doctoral Programs offer students the opportunity to work closely with first-rate faculty in the areas of Economics, Management (with concentrations in Accounting, Finance, Management Information Systems, Marketing, Operations Management, Quantitative Methods/Management Science, and Strategic Management), and Organizational Behavior & Human Resource Management (OBHR).
The School of Business's doctoral programs were ranked #23 in the world for 2009 and #25 for 2013 by Financial Times.

Facilities
The school's facilities are located on the southeastern part of Purdue's West Lafayette campus near the Purdue Memorial Union. The majority of undergraduate classes are conducted in the Krannert Building, which opened in 1964. Rawls Hall is the home of all the classes in the Masters program. Rawls Hall houses 13 electronically equipped classrooms, a professional career center, a multimedia-based auditorium, 25 breakout rooms, distance learning facilities, and sophisticated computer labs. The building is named for business master's alum, Jerry S. Rawls. Rawls, the president and chief executive officer of Finisar Corp., donated $10 million to the Krannert at the Frontier Campaign. The gift was the largest in the school's history and one of the largest at Purdue. In recognition of his generosity, the Purdue Board of Trustees voted in 2000 to name the new facility Jerry S. Rawls Hall. The Jerry Rawls Hall was dedicated on October 2, 2003. In September 2022, Purdue announced a new state-of-the-art building that will be built to hold the increase in students and faculty with an estimated completion of 2026.

Alumni
 Sam Allen, retired chairman and chief executive officer for Deere & Company
 Susan Bulkeley Butler, founder and CEO of the SBB Institute, and first female partner of Accenture
 Drew Brees, retired NFL quarterback for the New Orleans Saints
 Beth Brooke-Marciniak, global vice chair of public policy for Ernst & Young
 Doug DeVos, president of Amway
 Joe Forehand, former chairman and CEO of Accenture
 Dave Fuente, chairman of SSA & Company
 Greg Hayes, CEO and chair of United Technologies; Business Roundtable member
 Robbie Hummel, professional basketball player
 Howard Lance, executive advisor at The Blackstone Group, former chairman, president, and CEO of Harris Corporation
 Marshall Larsen, retired chairman, president, and CEO at Goodrich
 Preston McAfee, chief economist at Microsoft
 Jerry S. Rawls, co-founder and chairman of Finisar
 Donald Rice, former secretary of the Air Force and California businessman
 Dulquer Salmaan, Indian film actor

See also
List of business schools in the United States
List of United States graduate business school rankings

References

 
Business schools in Indiana
Purdue University
Educational institutions established in 1962
The Washington Campus
1962 establishments in Indiana